Rusi Petrov (born 26 April 1944) is a retired Bulgarian wrestler who competed in the 1972 Summer Olympics. 

In 1971, at the World Wrestling Championship he won gold in Men's freestyle, 90 kg category.

References

External links
 

1944 births
Living people
Olympic wrestlers of Bulgaria
Wrestlers at the 1972 Summer Olympics
Bulgarian male sport wrestlers
20th-century Bulgarian people
21st-century Bulgarian people